Otumi is a town  situated in Kwaebibirem District, Ghana. GOPDC currently owns two industrial plantations.

References

Populated places in the Eastern Region (Ghana)